Laflèche (originally known as Mackayville) is a neighbourhood in the Saint-Hubert borough of the city of Longueuil.

Neighbourhood
Laflèche is primarily a densely populated residential neighbourhood. It is largely low-income, and similar to Ville LeMoyne and other parts of the Le Vieux-Longueuil borough. Most buildings in the area are single-family homes, but there are also many small apartment buildings scattered throughout the neighbourhood. Boulevard Taschereau, Boulevard Édouard and Chemin de la Grande Allée are the main arteries in Laflèche, and all three feature numerous businesses.

Laflèche is reputed for its small house built with tar up planks taken from the rail industry. A good proportion of the first inhabitants of the neighbourhood worked at the Canadian National plant in Pointe-Saint-Charles, which made it easier for workers to carry large pieces of wood in Laflèche to build houses.

The oldest house of the neighborhood is on Duke street. It was built at the end of the 19th century.

History
Laflèche is a neighbourhood that was built mostly between 1930 and 1960. During the beginning of the 20th century,  the territory was part of the Saint-Antoine de Longueuil Parish. Originally  known as St-Lambert Heights, the name of the land was  changed to Mackayville in honour of a Montreal notary who managed the development of the land in the 1920s.

With the opening of Jacques-Cartier Bridge in 1930 and the steadily increase of cars, many Montreal working families moved to the South Shore, including Mackayville.

Montreal and Southern Counties Railway  had a tram stop in Mackayville at the corner Grande-Allée and Edouard. The building, which eventually became a Perette convenience store, still exists today.

Mackayville  became an independent city in 1947 at the same time as neighbouring Ville Jacques-Cartier. Mackayville got its first sewer in 1956.

The city changed its name to Laflèche on March 5, 1959. It later merged with the city of St. Hubert in October 1971, when its population was about 15,000.

Throughout the 1970s, Laflèche was nicknamed  petit Saint-Henri de la Rive-Sud
(the little Saint-Henri of the South Shore) because its inhabitants were viewed as being rough.

Demographics
In 2001, the district of Laflèche was estimated to have just under 17,000 people. This makes it around the same size as the neighbouring borough of Greenfield Park. The below figures are based on the three census tracts that form Laflèche.

Language

From Canada 2006 Census

Government
The city hall, police station and fire station of Laflèche were located at the corner of Boulevard Grande-Allée and Rue Georges.

Mayors

Education

The South Shore Protestant Regional School Board previously served the municipality.

Geographic Location

Laflèche is bordered by Boulevard Taschereau to the west, Route 116 to the north, Boulevard Kimber to the east and Rue Soucy to the south.

References

External links
Marigot.ca
Laporte Socioeconomic data

Former municipalities in Quebec
Neighbourhoods in Longueuil
Populated places established in 1947
1947 establishments in Quebec
Populated places disestablished in 1971